Couch is an instrumental post-rock band based in Munich, Germany. The band is:

 Jürgen Söder (Guitar)
 Thomas Geltinger (Drums)
 Michael Heilrath (Bass)
 Stefanie Böhm (Keyboards); also plays in Ms. John Soda.

Discography
Couch (LP) (Kollaps) (1995)
3/Suppenkoma (7") (Kollaps) (1996)
Etwas benutzen (LP/CD) (Kollaps/Kitty-Yo) (1997)
Fantasy (Kollaps/Kitty-Yo/Matador) (August, 2000)
Profane (Kollaps/Kitty-Yo/Matador) (April, 2001)
Figur 5 (Morr Music) (June, 2006)

External links
Couch's Official Website
Couch's Matador Records official site
More info on Couch
Couch on Last.fm

German post-rock groups
Kitty-Yo artists
Morr Music artists
Matador Records artists